The Men's pentathlon P13 event for visually impaired athletes at the 2004 Summer Paralympics was held in the Athens Olympic Stadium on 22 September. It was won by Ihar Fartunau, representing .

References

M